Demiyat Kairatovich Slambekov (born 13 January 1997) is a Kazakhstani footballer who plays as a defender or midfielder for FK Aksu.

Career

In 2012, Slambekov joined the youth academy of Brazilian side Olé Brasil.

Before the 2015 season, he signed for Bayterek in the Kazakhstani second division.

Before the 2017 season, Slambekov signed for Kazakhstani top flight club Okzhetpes, where he made 2 appearances and scored 0 goals. On 19 April 2017, he debuted for Okzhetpes during a 4-1 win over Makhtaaral.

In 2017, Slambekov signed for Zhetysu in the Kazakhstani second division, helping them earn promotion to the Kazakhstani top flight.

Before the 2019 season, he signed for Lithuanian second division team Stumbras-2, but left due to financial problems.

On 20 June 2019, he debuted for Hegelmann Litauen during a 4-1 win over Žalgiris-2. On 20 June 2019, Slambekov scored his first goal for Hegelmann Litauen during a 4-1 win over Žalgiris-2 from the halfway line.

In July 2021, Slambekov joined FK Aksu.

References

External links
 
 

1997 births
Living people
Kazakhstani footballers
Kazakhstani expatriate footballers
Sportspeople from Almaty
Association football midfielders
Association football defenders
Kazakhstan Premier League players
Kazakhstan First Division players
FC Kairat players
FC Bayterek players
FC Zhetysu players
FC Aktobe players
FC Okzhetpes players
FC Stumbras players
Expatriate footballers in Brazil
Expatriate footballers in Lithuania
Kazakhstani expatriate sportspeople in Brazil